In algebra, a quartic function  is a function of the form

where a is nonzero,
which is defined by a polynomial of degree four, called a quartic polynomial.

A quartic equation, or equation of the fourth degree, is an equation that equates a quartic polynomial to zero, of the form

where .
The derivative of a quartic function is a cubic function.

Sometimes the term biquadratic is used instead of quartic, but, usually, biquadratic function refers to a quadratic function of a square (or, equivalently, to the function defined by a quartic polynomial without terms of odd degree), having the form

Since a quartic function is defined by a polynomial of even degree, it has the same infinite limit when the argument goes to positive or negative infinity. If a is positive, then the function increases to positive infinity at both ends; and thus the function has a global minimum. Likewise, if a is negative, it decreases to negative infinity and has a global maximum. In both cases it may or may not have another local maximum and another local minimum.

The degree four (quartic case) is the highest degree such that every polynomial equation can be solved by radicals, according to the Abel–Ruffini theorem.

History
Lodovico Ferrari is credited with the discovery of the solution to the quartic in 1540, but since this solution, like all algebraic solutions of the quartic, requires the solution of a cubic to be found, it could not be published immediately. The solution of the quartic was published together with that of the cubic by Ferrari's mentor Gerolamo Cardano in the book Ars Magna.

The Soviet historian I. Y. Depman (ru) claimed that even earlier, in 1486, Spanish mathematician Valmes was burned at the stake for claiming to have solved the quartic equation. Inquisitor General Tomás de Torquemada allegedly told Valmes that it was the will of God that such a solution be inaccessible to human understanding.  However, Petr Beckmann, who popularized this story of Depman in the West, said that it was unreliable and hinted that it may have been invented as Soviet antireligious propaganda. Beckmann's version of this story has been widely copied in several books and internet sites, usually without his reservations and sometimes with fanciful embellishments. Several attempts to find corroborating evidence for this story, or even for the existence of Valmes, have failed.

The proof that four is the highest degree of a general polynomial for which such solutions can be found was first given in the Abel–Ruffini theorem in 1824, proving that all attempts at solving the higher order polynomials would be futile. The notes left by Évariste Galois prior to dying in a duel in 1832 later led to an elegant complete theory of the roots of polynomials, of which this theorem was one result.

Applications
Each coordinate of the intersection points of two conic sections is a solution of a quartic equation. The same is true for the intersection of a line and a torus. It follows that quartic equations often arise in computational geometry and all related fields such as computer graphics, computer-aided design, computer-aided manufacturing and optics. Here are examples of other geometric problems whose solution involves solving a quartic equation.

In computer-aided manufacturing, the torus is a shape that is commonly associated with the endmill cutter.  To calculate its location relative to a triangulated surface, the position of a horizontal torus on the -axis must be found where it is tangent to a fixed line, and this requires the solution of a general quartic equation to be calculated.

A quartic equation arises also in the process of solving the crossed ladders problem, in which the lengths of two crossed ladders, each based against one wall and leaning against another, are given along with the height at which they cross, and the distance between the walls is to be found.

In optics, Alhazen's problem is "Given a light source and a spherical mirror, find the point on the mirror where the light will be reflected to the eye of an observer." This leads to a quartic equation.

Finding the distance of closest approach of two ellipses involves solving a quartic equation.

The eigenvalues of a 4×4 matrix are the roots of a quartic polynomial which is the characteristic polynomial of the matrix.

The characteristic equation of a fourth-order linear difference equation or differential equation is a quartic equation. An example arises in the Timoshenko-Rayleigh theory of beam bending.

Intersections between spheres, cylinders, or other quadrics can be found using quartic equations.

Inflection points and golden ratio

Moreover, the area of the region between the secant line and the quartic below the secant line equals the area of the region between the secant line and the quartic above the secant line. One of those regions is disjointed into sub-regions of equal area.

Solution

Nature of the roots
Given the general quartic equation

with real coefficients and  the nature of its roots is mainly determined by the sign of its discriminant 
 
This may be refined by considering the signs of four other polynomials:

such that  is the second degree coefficient of the associated depressed quartic (see below);

such that  is the first degree coefficient of the associated depressed quartic; 

which is 0 if the quartic has a triple root; and

which is 0 if the quartic has two double roots.

The possible cases for the nature of the roots are as follows:

 If  then the equation has two distinct real roots and two complex conjugate non-real roots.
 If  then either the equation's four roots are all real or none is.
 If  < 0 and  < 0 then all four roots are real and distinct.
 If  > 0 or  > 0 then there are two pairs of non-real complex conjugate roots.
 If  then (and only then) the polynomial has a multiple root. Here are the different cases that can occur:
 If  > 0 or ( > 0 and ( ≠ 0 or  ≠ 0)), there are a real double root and two complex conjugate roots.
 If  and  ≠ 0, there are a triple root and a simple root, all real.
 If  = 0, then:
If  < 0, there are two real double roots.
If  > 0 and  = 0, there are two complex conjugate double roots.
If , all four roots are equal to 

There are some cases that do not seem to be covered, but in fact they cannot occur.  For example,  = 0 and  ≤ 0 is not one of the cases.  In fact, if  and  = 0 then   > 0, since  so this combination is not possible.

General formula for roots

with  ≠ 0 are given in the following formula, which is deduced from the one in the section on Ferrari's method by back changing the variables (see ) and using the formulas for the quadratic and cubic equations.

and where

with

and
 where  is the aforementioned discriminant. For the cube root expression for Q, any of the three cube roots in the complex plane can be used, although if one of them is real that is the natural and simplest one to choose. The mathematical expressions of these last four terms are very similar to those of their cubic counterparts.

Special cases of the formula
In this case, either all roots are non-real or they are all real. One may prefer to express it in a purely real way, by using trigonometric functions, as follows:

where

If  and  the sign of   has to be chosen to have  that is one should define  as  maintaining the sign of 
The triple root  is a common root of the quartic and its second derivative  it is thus also the unique root of the remainder of the Euclidean division of the quartic by its second derivative, which is a linear polynomial. The simple root  can be deduced from 
If  and  the above expression for the roots is correct but misleading, hiding the fact that the polynomial is reducible and no cube root is needed to represent the roots.

Simpler cases

Reducible quartics
Consider the general quartic

Such a factorization will take one of two forms:

or

It turns out that:

In fact, several methods of solving quartic equations (Ferrari's method, Descartes' method, and, to a lesser extent, Euler's method) are based upon finding such factorizations.

Biquadratic equation
If  then the biquadratic function

defines a biquadratic equation, which is easy to solve.

Let the auxiliary variable .
Then  becomes a quadratic  in : . Then the roots of our quartic  are

Quasi-palindromic equation 
The polynomial
 
The change of variables  in  produces the quadratic equation  . Since , the quartic equation  may be solved by applying the quadratic formula twice.

Solution methods

Converting to a depressed quartic
For solving purposes, it is generally better to convert the quartic into a depressed quartic by the following simple change of variable. All formulas are simpler and some methods work only in this case. The roots of the original quartic are easily recovered from that of the depressed quartic by the reverse change of variable.

Let

be the general quartic equation we want to solve.

Substituting  for  gives, after regrouping the terms, the equation ,
where

Ferrari's solution
As explained in the preceding section, we may start with the depressed quartic equation

This depressed quartic can be solved by means of a method discovered by Lodovico Ferrari. The depressed equation may be rewritten (this is easily verified by expanding the square and regrouping all terms in the left-hand side) as

Then, we introduce a variable  into the factor on the left-hand side by adding  to both sides.

As the value of  may be arbitrarily chosen, we will choose it in order to complete the square on the right-hand side.

which may be rewritten as

This is the resolvent cubic of the quartic equation. The value of  may thus be obtained from Cardano's formula. When  is a root of this equation, the right-hand side of equation is the square

However, this induces a division by zero if . This implies , and thus that the depressed equation is bi-quadratic, and may be solved by an easier method (see above). This was not a problem at the time of Ferrari, when one solved only explicitly given equations with numeric coefficients. For a general formula that is always true, one thus needs to choose a root of the cubic equation such that . This is always possible except for the depressed equation .

Now, if  is a root of the cubic equation such that , equation becomes

Therefore, equation  may be rewritten as

This equation is easily solved by applying to each factor the quadratic formula. Solving them we may write the four roots as

As the two occurrences of  must denote the same sign, this leaves four possibilities, one for each root.

Therefore, the solutions of the original quartic equation are
 
A comparison with the general formula above shows that .

Descartes' solution
Descartes introduced in 1637 the method of finding the roots of a quartic polynomial by factoring it into two quadratic ones. Let

By equating coefficients, this results in the following system of equations:

If we set , then solving this equation becomes finding the roots of the resolvent cubic

which is done elsewhere. This resolvent cubic is equivalent to the resolvent cubic given above (equation (1a)), as can be seen by substituting U = 2m.

If  is a square root of a non-zero root of this resolvent (such a non-zero root exists except for the quartic , which is trivially factored),

The symmetries in this solution are as follows.

Euler's solution
A variant of the previous method is due to Euler. Unlike the previous methods, both of which use some root of the resolvent cubic, Euler's method uses all of them. Consider a depressed quartic . Observe that, if
 ,
then
 ,
 .
Therefore, . This is indeed true and it follows from Vieta's formulas. It also follows from Vieta's formulas, together with the fact that we are working with a depressed quartic, that . (Of course, this also follows from the fact that .)

For the same reason,

the sign of the square roots will be dealt with below. The only solution of this system is:

Since, in general, there are two choices for each square root, it might look as if this provides  choices for the set }, but, in fact, it provides no more than  such choices, because the consequence of replacing one of the square roots by the symmetric one is that the set } becomes the set }.

Then, one computes the number . But a straightforward computation shows that

This argument suggests another way of choosing the square roots:

Solving by Lagrange resolvent
The symmetric group  on four elements has the Klein four-group as a normal subgroup. This suggests using a  whose roots may be variously described as a discrete Fourier transform or a Hadamard matrix transform of the roots; see Lagrange resolvents for the general method. If we set

 

then since the transformation is an involution we may express the roots in terms of the four  in exactly the same way. These are the roots of the polynomial

By the fundamental theorem of symmetric polynomials, these coefficients may be expressed as polynomials in the coefficients of the monic quartic.

In fact we obtain, apparently, several expressions, depending on the numbering of the roots of the cubic polynomial and of the signs given to their square roots.

These expressions are unnecessarily complicated, involving the cubic roots of unity, which can be avoided as follows.

then

This gives exactly the same formula for the roots as the one provided by Descartes' method.

Solving with algebraic geometry
There is an alternative solution using algebraic geometry In brief, one interprets the roots as the intersection of two quadratic curves, then finds the three reducible quadratic curves (pairs of lines) that pass through these points (this corresponds to the resolvent cubic, the pairs of lines being the Lagrange resolvents), and then use these linear equations to solve the quadratic.

The four roots of the depressed quartic  may also be expressed as the  coordinates of the intersections of the two quadratic equations  and  i.e., using the substitution  that two quadratics intersect in four points is an instance of Bézout's theorem.

These four points are not collinear because they lie on the irreducible quadratic  and thus there is a 1-parameter family of quadratics (a pencil of curves) passing through these points. Writing the projectivization of the two quadratics as quadratic forms in three variables:

This pencil contains three reducible quadratics, each corresponding to a pair of lines, each passing through two of the four points, which can be done  =  different ways. Given any two of these, their intersection has exactly the four points.

See also

References

Further reading

External links

Ferrari's achievement

Elementary algebra
Equations
Polynomial functions